CryptoNote is an application layer protocol designed for use with cryptocurrencies that aims to solve specific problems identified in Bitcoin. Namely:

 Traceability of transactions
 The proof-of-work function (see Bitcoin network)
 Irregular emission
 Hardcoded constants
 Bulky scripts
 Financial privacy

The protocol powers several decentralized privacy-oriented cryptocurrencies, including Monero, MobileCoin and Safex Cash.

Nothing is known about the original author of CryptoNote, "Nicolas van Saberhagen." Its mathematical component and motivation are described in the article "CryptoNote Whitepaper", released in two editions: in 2012 and in 2013. Launched in the summer of 2012, Bytecoin was the first cryptocurrency to use this technology. Later, several teams launched their networks, based on the Bytecoin code.

Emission 
Just like in Bitcoin, miners are rewarded for finding solutions. But the stepped release curve characteristic of Bitcoin has been replaced with a smooth one in CryptoNote: the reward decreases with each block.

One implementation of the CryptoNote protocol has resulted in a non-smooth emission curve, specifically, the S-curve of the Safex Blockchain, which was designed to match the Diffusion of Innovations technology adoption curve theory.

See also 

 Monero (cryptocurrency)

References

Application layer protocols
Cryptocurrencies
Digital currencies